Stacey Tookey (born July 10, 1976) is a Canadian choreographer and dancer known for her frequent appearances as a resident choreographer and guest judge on the Canadian and American versions of the dance-competition reality-television show So You Think You Can Dance.

Tookey served as director on the sold-out 2009 So You Think You Can Dance Canada Tour. She also choreographed the music video for the song "Jar of Hearts" by pop singer Christina Perri and appeared on the CBBC show The Next Step.

Early life and education
She was born and raised in Edmonton, Alberta.

Tookey is the eldest child of parents Shelley and Wayne Tookey. She studied ballet and contemporary dance with the Ballet British Columbia Mentor Program, Fusion Dance Company, and as a member of the National Basketball Association's Grizzlies Extreme Dance Team.

Career
Tookey has worked with musical artists including Michael Bublé, Celine Dion, Bette Midler and Justin Timberlake.

She has also performed in concerts as a member of Mia Michaels company R.A.W. and with the Parsons Dance Project in Seoul, South Korea. Other performances include appearing in Carmen with the Houston Grand Opera in Houston, Texas.

She served as assistant choreographer for the Broadway production of A Few Good Men Dancin in New York City, New York.

In 2002, Tookey relocated to Las Vegas, Nevada, where she was an original cast member for the entire five-year run of Celine Dion's show A New Day... at Caesars Palace. Other performances with Dion include appearances on  The Oprah Winfrey Show, The 2004 World Music Awards, Larry King Live, CNN's New Year's Eve Countdown Live in Times Square and A&E's biography of Dion.

She was nominated for Primetime Emmy Award for Outstanding Choreography for So You Think You Can Dance (season 5) in 2010. She was nominated again in 2011 for her work on the show's seventh season and in 2012 for her work on the show's eighth season.

Tookey represented Canada at the Genée International Ballet Competitions in London, England.

In addition to performing, Tookey teaches master classes in Mexico, Italy, Argentina and throughout North America, and has been the recipient of many choreography awards.

She is on the faculty of the NUVO dance convention.

Choreography for So You Think You Can Dance

Personal life
Tookey married actor Gene Gabriel on October 16, 2005, and resides in Los Angeles, California. They have a daughter born in January 2015.

See also
 List of choreographers
 List of dancers
 List of people from Edmonton
 List of people from Las Vegas
 List of people from Los Angeles

References

External links
 
 
 
 SYTYCD7 - Billy Bell & Ade Obayomi - Mad World by Stacey Tookey

1976 births
20th-century Canadian educators
20th-century American educators
21st-century Canadian educators
21st-century American educators
Canadian cheerleaders
Canadian choreographers
Canadian directors
Canadian educators
Canadian expatriates in the United States
Canadian female dancers
Educators from California
21st-century American women educators
Educators from New York City
Educators from Nevada
Living people
National Basketball Association cheerleaders
Participants in American reality television series
Participants in Canadian reality television series
People from Edmonton
So You Think You Can Dance choreographers
So You Think You Can Dance Canada
20th-century American women educators
20th-century Canadian women
Canadian women choreographers